In Greek mythology, the Achaean Leaders were those who led the expedition to Troy to retrieve the abducted Helen, wife of Menelaus, king of Sparta. Most of the leaders were bound by the Oath of Tyndareus who made the Suitors of Helen swear that they would defend and protect the chosen husband of Helen against any wrong done against him in regard to his marriage.

List of leaders

Number of ships

Ethnicity

See also 

 Catalogue of Ships
 Suitors of Helen
 Trojan Leaders
 Trojan War

References